"Nutshell" is a song by Alice in Chains that originally appeared on the band's 1994 extended play Jar of Flies. The band played it on MTV Unplugged in 1996, and this rendition of the song was included on the compilation album Music Bank (1999), as well as The Essential Alice in Chains (2006). Since 2011, guitarist/vocalist Jerry Cantrell dedicates "Nutshell" to Alice in Chains' late original members Layne Staley and Mike Starr during the band's concerts.

Lyrics and music

Lyrics 
The lyrics were written by vocalist Layne Staley, and the music was written by bassist Mike Inez, guitarist/vocalist Jerry Cantrell and drummer Sean Kinney.

Bassist Mike Inez said of "Nutshell" when asked what song makes him think of Layne Staley the most:
I think the No. 1 for me is "Nutshell." Layne was very honest with his songwriting. And in "Nutshell," he really put everything in a nutshell for everybody. That song still gets me choked up whenever I play it. I get a little teary-eyed, and sometimes when we're doing the arena runs especially, they'll have some video footage of Layne. And I look and see me and Jerry [Cantrell, vocals and guitar] and Sean [Kinney, drums] looking the wrong way. We're not looking at the audience, we're looking back at Layne, and it's pretty cool that there's still that song for us. Yeah, it's just a sad thing.

Music 
Jon Pareles of The New York Times commented that the arrangements on "Nutshell" recalled those of Canadian musician Neil Young.

Reception
Although never released as a single, it is one of the best-known Alice in Chains' songs among the band’s fans.

In 2013, "Nutshell" was ranked No. 9 on Rolling Stone's readers' poll "The 10 Saddest Songs of All Time". In 2014, the song was ranked No. 5 on Loudwire's "10 Best Alice In Chains Songs" list.It was ranked No. 4 on Kerrang!’s “20 Best Alice In Chains Songs” list.

Live performances
Alice in Chains performed the song for the first time at the Memorial Hall in Kansas City on September 22, 1993. The band performed an acoustic version of "Nutshell" for its appearance on MTV Unplugged on April 10, 1996. It was the opening song of the concert and was included on the Unplugged live album and home video release. The Unplugged concert marked the last time the band performed the song with Layne Staley.

Since 2011, Jerry Cantrell dedicates "Nutshell" to Layne Staley and Mike Starr during Alice In Chains' concerts with new vocalist William DuVall. During their concert at the Hellfest Open Air Festival in Clisson, France on June 24, 2018, Cantrell dedicated the song to his longtime friend and Pantera drummer Vinnie Paul, who died two days before the concert.

Certifications

References

Alice in Chains songs
Rock ballads
Songs about loneliness
Songs about suicide
1990s ballads
1994 songs
Songs written by Jerry Cantrell
Songs written by Layne Staley
Songs written by Mike Inez
Songs written by Sean Kinney
Alternative rock ballads